MCCB may stand for:

 Mississippi Community College Board
 Molded Case Circuit Breaker, a type of low-voltage circuit breaker
 Mount Carmel College of Baler